Events from the year 1205 in Ireland.

Incumbent
Lord: John

Events
Enniscorthy Castle, an Anglo-Norman stronghold was built on high ground beside the River Slaney
Hugh de Lacy, 1st Earl of Ulster was reappointed Viceroy of Ireland

References

 
1200s in Ireland
Ireland
Years of the 13th century in Ireland